Guindy Thiru Vi Ka Industrial Estate is a neighbourhood in Chennai, India. This was an active small scale industrial estate in the 1960s and 1970s but is gradually turning to new economy companies. Its central location makes it an attractive proposition for new business.

See also
 Economy of Chennai

References

Neighbourhoods in Chennai
Industrial parks in India